Birch Bay is a protected bay of the east shore of the Salish Sea, between Semiahmoo Bay and Lummi Bay; approximately  north of Seattle and   south of Vancouver, BC, Canada.

The bay gives its name to a census-designated place (CDP) along the bay's shore in Whatcom County, Washington, United States.  The population was 8,413 at the 2010 census, a 69.6% increase over the 2000 census.

Birch Bay was named in 1792 by Archibald Menzies, a member of the Vancouver Expedition. Vancouver's two ships used Birch Bay as an anchorage for several days. Menzies noted a number of species of birch and gave the name to the bay.

Geography
Birch Bay is located at  (48.932167, -122.747192).

According to the United States Census Bureau, the CDP has a total area of 21.2 square miles (55.0 km2), of which, 15.8 square miles (40.9 km2) of it is land and 5.4 square miles (14.0 km2) of it (25.45%) is water.

Geology

Birch Bay is a headland bay created by the refraction of incoming waves on the headlands that lie on either side of the bay. The headland to the north is Birch Point, and the one to the south is Point Whitehorn. The waves bend as they enter the bay and lose energy in the process. The result is a half-moon-shaped bay with a gentle sloping beach. The beach has been modified in past years by the implementation of groins and riprap. Terrell Creek runs parallel along a section of the beach, eventually flowing into the bay.

Demographics

As of the census of 2000, there were 4,961 people, 2,125 households, and 1,417 families residing in the CDP. The population density was 313.7 people per square mile (121.2/km2). There were 5,105 housing units at an average density of 322.8/sq mi (124.7/km2). The racial makeup of the CDP was 92.36% White, 1.23% Asian, 1.19% Native American, 1.05% African American, 0.14% Pacific Islander, 1.91% from other races, and 2.12% from two or more races. Hispanic or Latino of any race were 4.45% of the population.

There were 2,125 households, out of which 27.0% had children under the age of 18 living with them, 53.5% were married couples living together, 9.3% had a female householder with no husband present, and 33.3% were non-families. 26.4% of all households were made up of individuals, and 8.2% had someone living alone who was 65 years of age or older. The average household size was 2.33 and the average family size was 2.80.

In the CDP, the age distribution of the population shows 23.2% under the age of 18, 6.2% from 18 to 24, 27.0% from 25 to 44, 27.7% from 45 to 64, and 15.9% who were 65 years of age or older. The median age was 41 years. For every 100 females, there were 97.4 males. For every 100 females age 18 and over, there were 92.9 males.

The median income for a household in the CDP was $40,040, and the median income for a family was $44,280. Males had a median income of $41,198 versus $27,076 for females. The per capita income for the CDP was $21,204. About 6.7% of families and 9.4% of the population were below the poverty line, including 13.7% of those under age 18 and 0.9% of those age 65 or over.

Surrounding municipalities

See also
 Birch Bay State Park
 Cherry Point Refinery

References

External links

 Birch Bay's Chamber of Commerce Home Page
 Birch Bay Webcam

Census-designated places in Washington (state)
Census-designated places in Whatcom County, Washington